WTVI (channel 42) is a PBS member television station in Charlotte, North Carolina, United States, owned by Central Piedmont Community College. The station's studios are located in the Chantilly-Commonwealth section of east Charlotte, and its transmitter is located in the unincorporated area of Newell in northeastern Mecklenburg County (just northeast of the Charlotte city limits). It is the only public television station in North Carolina that is not operated by PBS North Carolina, and is one of three PBS member stations serving the Charlotte metropolitan area, along with PBS North Carolina's WUNG-TV (channel 58) in Concord and South Carolina Educational Television (SCETV)'s WNSC-TV (channel 30) in Rock Hill.

History

The station first signed on the air on August 27, 1965; it was originally owned by the Charlotte-Mecklenburg Board of Education. The WTVI call letters were first used by what is now Fox affiliate KTVI in St. Louis, Missouri, from 1953 to 1955, when it was licensed to Belleville, Illinois, on the east side of the Mississippi River; they were then held from 1955 to 1962 by a station in Fort Pierce, Florida. WTVI's original station manager was Donna Lee Davenport, who was also instrumental in creating the station. In 1982, WTVI's license was transferred to the not-for-profit Charlotte–Mecklenburg Public Broadcasting Authority, turning the station into a community-owned entity.

Mecklenburg County covered the debt on WTVI's digital broadcasting equipment and maintains the station's studios, located on Commonwealth Avenue in Charlotte. The county also paid WTVI $95,000 annually to broadcast county commission meetings.

In 2004, WTVI cut back on more well-known PBS programs. Ratings increased for a while with "alternative" shows, but after several years the station ended up in trouble. On June 30, 2011, WTVI's board was advised that the station was running a $300,000 deficit and that its long-term operation was questionable if its financial situation did not improve. On March 13, 2012, Central Piedmont Community College offered to take over the station. The college requested $1.35 million from Mecklenburg County; $357,000 to complete the purchase and about $800,000 to give the station a significant technical overhaul. The Mecklenburg County Commission approved funding for the deal on March 20.

Without county money, Central Piedmont Community College would have been unable to complete the purchase and the station would have likely ceased operations on June 30, 2012. The deal was approved by the Federal Communications Commission on May 21, 2012, and the acquisition of WTVI was completed on July 1, 2012, with the broadcast licenses being transferred the following day. As a result, WTVI became operated by an educational licensee for the second time in its history. At that time, it became one of seven full-time PBS member stations to be operated by a community college (alongside Milwaukee PBS; WDCQ-TV in Bay City, Michigan; WVUT-TV in Vincennes, Indiana; KACV in Amarillo, Texas; KNCT in Killeen, Texas; WSRE in Pensacola, Florida and WBCC in Orlando, Florida (WBCC, now WEFS, has since left PBS, while KNCT would leave PBS six years later).

Three months after taking over operations, Central Piedmont Community College brought back familiar PBS shows such as Sesame Street, Downton Abbey, Nova and Nature to the schedule. Additional local programming is planned, including some previously aired on the college's cable channel. Among the new shows is Off the Record, hosted by David Rhew and similar to Jerry Hancock's Final Edition, dropped in 2009 for budgetary reasons.

WTVI is one of the few PBS member stations that do not clear the weekend edition of PBS NewsHour.

Technical information

Subchannels
The station's digital signal is multiplexed:

Prior to February 17, 2009, WTVI carried "The Civic Channel" on digital subchannel 42.2, Create on digital subchannel 42.3, PBS Kids on digital subchannel 42.4, and a high definition feed of WTVI on digital subchannel 42.5; the fourth and fifth subchannels were dropped on February 17 with Create moving to 42.3 and the main channel on 42.1 upgrading to high definition. In July 2010, "The Civic Channel" was replaced by MHz Worldview. In November 2015, MHz Worldview was dropped and a simulcast of Create was placed on subchannel 42.2 until February 2016, when it was replaced with NHK World. On January 30, 2022, Create was dropped and the subchannel was deleted.

Analog-to-digital conversion
WTVI began broadcasting its digital signal on VHF channel 11, carrying four digital subchannels, including one high-definition channel. WTVI was the first television station in Charlotte to produce programming in high-definition in 2000. The station shut down its analog signal, over UHF channel 42, on February 17, 2009, the original target date in which full-power television stations in the United States were to transition from analog to digital broadcasts under federal mandate. The station's digital signal remained on its pre-transition VHF channel 11. Through the use of PSIP, digital television receivers display the station's virtual channel as its former UHF analog channel 42.

References

External links

TVI
Television channels and stations established in 1965
1965 establishments in North Carolina
PBS member stations
Low-power television stations in the United States